Jordan Jace Gregory (born June 26, 1992) is an American professional basketball player.

Professional career
In June 2016, Gregory signed with Aris Leeuwarden of the Dutch Basketball League (DBL). Gregory was the DBL scoring champion of the 2016–17 season, after he averaged 18.5 points per game. Gregory and Aris finished the DBL season in the 7th seed, missing out on the playoffs.

On July 18, 2017, Gregory signed a 1-year contract with Landstede Basketbal of the DBL. Over 32 regular season games, Gregory averaged 15.4 points, 4.0 rebounds and 2.4 assists per game. In the play-offs, Landstede was defeated in the semifinals by ZZ Leiden, 0–4.

In the 2018–19 season, Gregory played with CB Marín Peixegalego in the Spanish LEB Oro.

References

External links
Profile at Spanish Basketball Federation
Montana Grizzlies bio

1992 births
Living people
American expatriate basketball people in the Netherlands
American expatriate basketball people in Spain
American men's basketball players
Aris Leeuwarden players
Basketball players from Colorado
Dutch Basketball League players
Landstede Hammers players
Montana Grizzlies basketball players
Shooting guards
Sportspeople from Pueblo, Colorado